Jagadguru Adi Shankara is a 2013 Indian Telugu-language biographical film written and directed by J. K. Bharavi that depicts the life of 8th-century philosopher Adi Shankara. The ensemble cast includes Kaushik Babu in the title role of Adi Shankaracharya, Nagarjuna, Mohan Babu, Suman, Srihari and Sai Kumar. Chiranjeevi reprises his role of Sri Manjunatha from the 2001 film of the eponymous name in a cameo appearance.

Plot
Adi Shankara is born at Kalady in Kerala to a Brahmin family. Soon after Adi Shankara is born, Agni the fire-god, says to Rudraksha Rushi that he has only 8 years of life. So, Rudraksha Rushi gives 24 years of life to Shankara from his span, at a cycle of every 8 years whenever Shankara's life is in trouble. After his father's death, Shankara shows his remarkable power in acquiring mastery over four Vedas at the age of eight. When he is caught by a crocodile in the Purna river, he seeks the permission of his mother to become a Sanyasi, and then only the crocodile leaves him. Reluctantly, his mother accepts his proposal and then the crocodile disappears.

Shankara leaves for North India in search of a guru. Then he finds his guru, Govinda Bhagavatpada. Bhagavatpada teaches Shankara 'Jala Stambhana', 'Agnisthambana', 'Vaayusthambana' and 'Parakaya Pravesha' (leaving one's own soul and entering others) etc. skills. Soon, Shankara decides to preach his Advaita Vedanta philosophy to the people who are quarreling among themselves in the name of caste and religion. Shankara teaches a lesson to one such person, Kapalikudu, who is responsible for the quarrels among the people. In another sequence, a Chandala proves to Shankara that all the people are equal before God.

During his philosophical tour which spans the cities of Srisailam, Sringeri, Srirangam, Pithapuram, Nashik, Khajuraho, Ujjain, Kathmandu, Simhachalam, Aravalli, Varanasi, Madurai, Pushpagiri, Kurukshetra, Khandwa, Dwaraka, Kumbakonam, Draksharamam, Ajanta, Somnath, Kolar, Konark, Murudeshwara, Kanyakumari, Badrinath, Nanjangud, Guruvayur, Dandakaranya, Alampuram, Shravanabelagola, Sarnath, Chidambaram, Puri, Tirumala, Haridwar, Taxila, Prayagraj, Ayodhya, Patna, Parli, Srikalahasti and Bhimashankara, Shankara gets a chance to debate with Maṇḍana Miśra. While Miśra is about to give up, his wife Ubhaya Bharati challenges Shankara by asking some questions on sex and related subjects. As Shankara is a Sanyasi, he cannot answer her questions. He then asks for a recess of 15 days. He later does Parakaya Pravesha and enters the dead body of King Amaraka Maharaju. He then makes love with his wife and learns and gets the answers to the questions posed by Ubhaya Bharati. Although being a sage, he performs the rituals of his dead mother by invoking Lord Shiva. This factor irks the elders of his religion. However, they repent for their actions later. Finally, having occupied 'Sarvagnapeetha' of Kashmir, Adi Shankara walks through the Himalayas, gets salvation and merges into Lord Shiva. He is believed to merge into Shiva at present-day Kedarnath.

Cast

Soundtrack

Music was composed by Nag Sri Vatsa. Music was released on ADITYA Music Company. The soundtrack of fourteen tracks was released by Paripoornananda Saraswati, on 11 March 2013.

Home Media 
Producers planned in low expensive. Blu-ray studio took copy from producers. Later on 30 September 2013 HD DVD came in force. Later broadcast right acquired by Gemini TV.

Reception 
Karthik Pasupulate of The Times of India, rated the film 1.5/5 and wrote: "The movie isn't great enough to be even funny." Pasupalate criticized the lead actor by stating, "Kaushik is an absolute disaster who when not looking dazed, looks intensely agitated." 123Telugu.com which rated the film 3/5, opined, "‘Jagadguru Adishankara’ is a film that will appeal to elderly people and folks who are devotionally inclined." The reviewer, however, criticized the technical departments of the film such as VFX, cinematography and editing.

References

External links 
 
 

2013 directorial debut films
2013 films
Adi Shankara
Biographical films about philosophers
Biographical films about religious leaders
Films about Hinduism
Films about religion
Hindu devotional films
Hindu mythological films
Indian biographical films
2010s Telugu-language films